Lingo is an American television game show with multiple international adaptations. In it, contestants compete to decode five-letter words given the first letter, similarly to Jotto, with each correctly guessed word earning number draws to attempt filling in a Bingo card.

Four Lingo series have aired in the United States. The first was aired in daily syndication from September 28, 1987, until March 25, 1988, and taped at the BCTV studios in the Vancouver suburb of Burnaby, British Columbia; initially hosted by Michael Reagan, series creator Ralph Andrews took over beginning in February 1988. On August 5, 2002, Game Show Network (GSN) premiered a revival of Lingo, which was hosted by Chuck Woolery and ran for six seasons through 2007. On June 6, 2011, GSN premiered a second revival hosted by comedian Bill Engvall, running for one season.

On February 11, 2022, CBS announced that it had ordered a primetime revival of Lingo, with RuPaul as host and executive producer, which premiered on January 11, 2023.

Gameplay

1987 version

Two teams of two contestants, one of them usually a returning champion, compete. To start the game, each team receives a randomly generated "Lingo" card, similar in manner to a Bingo card, with some spaces already filled in. The 1987 version started with seven spaces filled in, while all other versions start with ten.

The team is then given the first letter of a five-letter mystery word and must make attempts at guessing the word by spelling it out. To assist in figuring out the word, each letter lights up. A letter that turns red is in the mystery word and in the right place, one that is yellow is in the mystery word but in the wrong place, and one that does not light up is not in the mystery word at all. If the team did not come up with the right word on the first try, they were shown which letters were correctly-placed as well as those in the word but not correctly placed. A team has five turns in which to guess the word.

Control passes to the opposing team if the team in control either fails to make a guess before five seconds expire; makes an invalid guess (a misspelled word, a proper noun, a contraction, a hyphenate, or a word not five letters in length), or guesses incorrectly on the fifth turn. Passing control to the opposing team also reveals another letter in the word, unless doing so would fill in the word completely. If the opposing team still fails to guess, then the word is discarded and a new one generated.

After correctly guessing a word, a team draws balls from a hopper in front of them. Most of the balls contain numbers, which correspond to those on each team's respective Lingo board. The 1987 version also featured "prize balls," which awarded trips or cash if drawn. Also present are red balls, which if drawn, immediately forfeit control to the opposing team. Starting with the 2002 version, the red balls were known as "stoppers." The goal of the Lingo board is to achieve five covered spaces in a row in any direction, known as a "Lingo". Doing so awarded $250 cash on the 1987 version, with the first team to complete a Lingo being declared the winner.

2002 version 
Gameplay on the GSN version was largely similar to that of its 1987 counterpart, though with several changes. Unlike the 1987 version, the 2002 version used a point system, and did not feature prize balls. Each correctly guessed word awarded 25 points, while scoring a "Lingo" awarded 50 points, a new Lingo board, and a letter in the bonus round. all point values were doubled in the second round of each game. In addition, the 2002 version introduced "mystery balls" in the second round; drawing one of these allowed a team to mark off any one number on their board. The team with the most points after the second round won the game. Ties on the 2002 version were broken by revealing a seven-letter word, starting with the first and last letters then working inward one letter at a time until a team gave the correct answer.

Bonus round
No Lingo (1987 version)
The bonus round of the 1987 version had the exact opposite objective of the front game, with teams working to avoid completing a line. Before the round started, the team was shown a Lingo card with all even numbers on it. Sixteen were covered to start the round. The champions were staked with $500 to start. For each mystery word, the team was given five chances to guess and were shown the first letter and one additional letter to start. If the team guessed the word on the first try, they drew one Lingo ball; one more was drawn for each subsequent guess, with a total of seven drawn if the word was not correctly guessed by the fifth turn.

After guessing words, the team drew balls from the hopper one at a time. If a number was already covered or not on the board, it was discarded. Each turn in which a Lingo (five in a row) was not achieved doubled the cash available. At any time after a draw, the team could choose to stop and collect their cash, or attempt another draw. Should any draw make a Lingo, all cash was forfeited. The maximum payout for surviving five turns without making a Lingo was $16,000. Regardless of whether or not the team won No Lingo, they would return to compete again the next day. Should the same team return to Double Lingo for a second or third day, the cash values would become $32,000 or $64,000 respectively. Teams stayed on the show until they won three games; this was later changed to staying on until the team won four times or lost twice.

Bonus Lingo (2002 version)

On the 2002 version, the winning team had two minutes to guess as many five-letter mystery words as possible. Two letters were initially revealed in each word, one of which was always the first letter. If the team failed to guess a word in five tries, it was revealed and the team moved on to the next word. The team won $100 for each correctly guessed word, up to $1,000 for ten words.

A Lingo card was then revealed with thirteen numbers marked off. The hopper contained twelve balls, one for each uncovered space on the board, and the team drew a ball for each mystery word successfully guessed in the first half of Bonus Lingo. Forming a Lingo won the team a $4,000 prize package consisting of an Argus digital camera, a Borders gift card, a Croton watch and a Cassiopeia EM-500 Pocket PC plus the money earned in the first half of Bonus Lingo.

From season two onward, teams were also given "bonus letters:" one for winning the game, and an additional one for each Lingo scored in the main game. Teams could elect to use a bonus letter at any time to fill in an unrevealed letter in a word, even if doing so would reveal the word. In addition, the layout of the Bonus Lingo card was changed so that twelve numbers were marked off and a Lingo could be achieved in only one draw. Doing so awarded a large prize, in seasons two and three, it was a trip and $5,000, in season four, it was a flat $10,000, in seasons five and six, it was a jackpot that began at $10,000 and increased by $1,000 each time it was unclaimed. In any case, achieving a Lingo in two or more draws awarded a flat $5,000. Failing to achieve a Lingo still awarded $100 for each correctly guessed word. Unlike the 1987 version, this version did not feature returning champions.

Tournaments and special episodes
GSN held a tournament of champions with particularly successful contestants from its second and third seasons. Instead of playing Bonus Lingo in the final tournament episode, a third round was played in which points tripled, meaning teams earned 75 points for a completed word and 150 points for a Lingo. The question mark balls from the second round carried over to the third round. At the end of the show, the team with the most points won a Suzuki Verona for each teammate.

A special episode that aired on April Fool's Day in 2003 had the entire roster of GSN's six original show hosts together playing for charity. While Woolery hosted, Mark L. Walberg (Russian Roulette) and Marc Summers (WinTuition) played against Kennedy (Friend or Foe?) and Graham Elwood (Cram), with Walberg and Summers shutting them out 500–0. The sixth host, Todd Newton (Whammy! The All-New Press Your Luck), served as the show's announcer.

2011 version

Each team begins the game with nine numbers marked off on their own board. At the start of the show, a member of each team draws a Lingo ball, and the team with the higher number gets to play first. Unlike in previous versions, the number balls are on a rack and not in a hopper. If the ball is a number ball, it is also marked off as the tenth number on the team's board. If the ball is a stopper or a prize ball, no number is marked off. Also unlike the previous versions, the host gives a clue as to the word's meaning.

Correctly identifying words in round one earn $100, $200 in round two and $500 in round three. Completing a five-number Lingo awards the same payouts as correct words in each round. When a new board is issued to a team, nine numbers are pre-marked. Three words each are played in rounds one and three, while four words are played in round two. The team with the most money after round three keeps it and plays Bonus Lingo. If a team is mathematically unable to catch up, the game ends once the balls have been drawn for the last word.

In Bonus Lingo, the winning team has 90 seconds to correctly guess five words, receiving two letters in each word. The team wins the identical amount earned in the main game for the first correct word and that amount is then doubled for each additional correct word until the fifth one, which earns the team $100,000. The amount earned in Bonus Lingo is added to the team's total winnings.

2023 version 
The 2023 revival does not use any bingo mechanics and consists only of word guessing. Each episode features two semi-final matches between two teams each, consisting of the following rounds:

 In the first round, each team plays three five-letter words. Guessing a word correctly on the first try (called a "Golden Guess") earns $5,000, with subsequent guesses worth $2,500, $2,000, $1,500, and $1,000, respectively. An invalid guess gives the opposing team a chance to steal. If the opposing team gives an invalid guess, play on that word ends.
 In the second round, "Super Lingo," each team is given a clue towards a ten-letter mystery word whose letters are revealed over time: each word is worth up to $5,000, with its value decreasing as more letters are revealed. Before they play their word, each team chooses from one of two hoppers of "Lucky Balls," from which a ball is drawn: gold "money balls" add a cash bonus (either $100, $500, or $1,000) on top of the value of the word if solved, while white "letter balls," numbered between 1 and 10, reveal the corresponding letter in the word before the money starts decreasing.
 In the third round, the "Lingo Battle," the two members of each team are assigned to five-letter and six-letter words respectively, with all values from round one doubled. If a contestant's guess for a word does not reveal a new correctly-placed (green) letter, control of that word passes to the opposing player. After the conclusion of this round, a twelve-letter Super Lingo word is played between both teams, which starts at $10,000. If time expires or no one solves it, the team with the most money wins.
 In the event of a tie game, one more Super Lingo word is played as a tiebreaker to determine the winner of the match.

The two winning teams advance to "Lingo Showdown" to compete for the episode's jackpot, which consists of $50,000 and the total scores of both teams in the main game. Each team attempts to solve as many words as they can in two minutes, alternating between five- and six-letter words worth 5 and 10 points respectively. The team who won more money in their match is given the option to either pass or play first. Teams can pass on words as often as needed. If the team gives an invalid guess on a word, the word in play is thrown out, and a new word is played. The team that scores more points wins the jackpot.

Broadcast history
The first version premiered on September 28, 1987, with Michael Reagan, adopted son of then U.S. President Ronald Reagan, as host and Dusty Martell as co-host. Beginning on February 22, 1988, executive producer Ralph Andrews took over as host and Margaux MacKenzie replaced Martell as co-host. New episodes aired until March 25, 1988, with repeats airing until September of that year. The show was produced by Ralph Andrews Productions (in association with Bernstein/Hovis Productions) in Canada for syndication by ABR Entertainment in the United States.

On August 5, 2002, Game Show Network revived the program with Chuck Woolery as host. In season three, a co-host was added to reveal the puzzles and provide banter. Woolery's co-host was Stacey Hayes in season three, while Hayes had Paula Cobb as another co-host for the first two episodes of the season. Hayes was later replaced by Shandi Finnessey for the remainder of the series. Randy Thomas, known for her work in Hooked on Phonics ads, was the offstage announcer in season two, with Hayes also acting as announcer in season three. For the remainder of the series, the role of announcer was eliminated.

The first 20 episodes were recorded in the Netherlands on the set of the program's Dutch counterpart; subsequent episodes were produced in the United States. Five more seasons, filmed in Los Angeles and each consisting of 65 episodes, began in December 2002, December 2003, August 2005, April 2006, and April 2007. GSN held back five unaired Hawaiian-themed episodes from season four, and these episodes later aired beginning January 1, 2007.

In 2011, GSN announced the show would restart production after a nearly four-year hiatus, with Bill Engvall as the new host. One season of forty episodes premiered on June 6, 2011. The last first-run show aired on August 1, 2011.

On February 11, 2022, CBS announced that it had ordered a primetime revival of Lingo, with RuPaul as host and executive producer; it was filmed at Dock10 in Salford, England (where the current British version is filmed) with American contestants. RuPaul also signed on to host a series of Celebrity Lingo episodes for broadcast in the UK. It premiered on January 11, 2023. On February 21, 2023, the series was renewed for a second season.

Episode status
The rights to the 1987 version of the show are held by Ion Television. Ion included it in a February 2007 "viewers vote" on its website, with site visitors being able to vote for the show to be included in the network's schedule. Despite this, Ion has not aired this or any other game show (except the previous year's Family Feud episodes by special arrangement) since 2005. The 2002 and 2011 versions of Lingo remain owned by Game Show Network.

International versions 
{| class="wikitable"
|-
! Country
! Name
! Host
! Channel
! Duration
|-
| rowspan=2| Canada 
| Lingo 
| Michael Reagan (1987)Ralph Andrews (1988)
| Syndication
| 1987–1988*
|-
| Lingo 
| Paul Houde
| Télévision de Radio-Canada
| 1998–2001
|-
|  France
| Motus
| Thierry Beccaro
| Antenne 2France 2
| style="white-space: nowrap;"| 1990–2019
|-
|  Germany
| 5 mal 5
| Bernd Schumacher
| Sat.1
| 1993–1994
|-
|  Indonesia
| Cocok – Coba-Coba Kata
| Denny Chandra
| SCTV
| 1996–1998
|-
|  Israel
| לינגוLingo
| Gil AlonAssaf Ashtar
| Channel 2
| 1994–19961997–1998
|-
|rowspan=3|  Italy
| Lingo
| Tiberio Timperi
| Canale 5
| 1992–1993
|-
| Una parola di troppo
| Giancarlo Magalli
| Rai 2
| 2021
|-
| Lingo – Parole in gioco
| Caterina Balivo
| La7
| 2022–present
|-
| Jordan
|Lingo| Abdallah Amara
| Jordan 1 TV
| 2019–present
|-
|  Netherlands
| Lingo| style="white-space: nowrap;"| Robert ten Brink (1989–1992)François Boulangé (1992–2000)Nance (2000–2005)Lucille Werner (2005–2014)Jan Versteegh (2019–present)
| Nederland 1 (1989–1991, 2006–2013)Nederland 2 (1991–1992, 2000–2006, 2014)Nederland 3 (1993–2000)SBS6 (2019–2021)Net5 (2022–present)
| 1989–20142019–present
|-
|  Norway
| Lingo| Anders Hatlo (1992–93)Truls Nebell (1993)
| TVNorge
| 1992–1993
|-
|rowspan=2|  Poland
| 5×5 – wygrajmy razem| Marek Grabowski
| TVP2
| 1995–1999
|-
| Lingo| Paweł Orleański
| TV4
| 2007
|-
|rowspan=2|  Portugal
| Lingo| Heitor LourençoTânia Ribas de OliveiraIsabel Angelino
|rowspan=2| RTP1
| 2006–2007
|-
| style="white-space: nowrap;"| Lingo-Eu Gosto do Verão| José Carlos Malato
| 2007
|-
|  Slovenia
| Lingo| Mito TrefaltEva Longyka
| TV Slovenija
| 1990s
|-
|  Spain
| Lingo| RamoncínEduardo AldánAna RuizAitor Albizua (May 2, 2022 – September 30, 2022)Jon Gómez (October 3, 2022 – December 1, 2022)
| TVE2Punto TVCanal SurETB2
| 1991–199620022021–20222022
|-
|rowspan=2 | Sweden
| Lingo| Martin ÖrnrothHarald Treutiger
| TV4TV4 Plus
| 1993–19972003
|-
| PostkodLingo| Henrik Johnsson
| TV4
| 2013
|-
|rowspan=2 | United Kingdom
| Lingo| Martin DanielsAdil Ray
|rowspan=2 |ITV
| 19882021–present
|-
| Celebrity Lingo| RuPaul
| 2022
|}
* Aired in both the U.S. and Canada for both audiences

 Merchandise 
In late 2021, Two Way Media launched a mobile version of Lingo available for iOS and Android users. The game follows a similar format to the 2002–2007 format of Lingo. However, there are some slight differences. Players have a choice of playing either a four letter, five letter, or six letter round. If the player correctly guesses a word, they win coins and have the option to play bingo. This version of Lingo'' does not feature a bonus round.

See also 
 Wordle

References

External links
  (1987–88)
  (2002–07)
  (2011)
  (2023)

1980s American game shows
1987 American television series debuts
1988 American television series endings
2000s American game shows
2002 American television series debuts
2007 American television series endings
2010s American game shows
2011 American television series debuts
2011 American television series endings
2020s American game shows
2023 American television series debuts
American television series revived after cancellation
Bingo
CBS original programming
English-language television shows
First-run syndicated television programs in the United States
Game Show Network original programming
Television series by All3Media
Television series by Ralph Andrews Productions
Television shows filmed in Burnaby